Alfa Romeo Giulietta is the name of three different automobiles made by Italian car manufacturer Alfa Romeo:

 The first Giulietta (Type 750 and 101) was a rear-wheel drive car made from 1954 to 1965, in 4-door saloon/sedan, coupé, spider and estate forms. It was replaced by the Alfa Romeo Giulia.
 In turn, the Giulia was replaced by the second Giulietta (Type 116), a rear-wheel drive 4-door saloon/sedan related to the Alfa Romeo Alfetta and made from 1977 to 1985.
 The third generation Giulietta (Type 940) is a front-wheel drive family hatchback produced from 2010 to 2020.

External links 
 

Giulietta